Pio XII is a municipality in the state of Maranhão in the Northeast region of Brazil. The city gained international notoriety when Otávio Jordão da Silva, a referee at an amateur football match, was beheaded and quartered after he fatally stabbed a player to death.

It is named after Pope Pius XII.

The municipality contains a small part of the Baixada Maranhense Environmental Protection Area, a  sustainable use conservation unit created in 1991 that has been a Ramsar Site since 2000.

See also
List of municipalities in Maranhão

References

Municipalities in Maranhão